Acanthophila qinlingensis is a moth in the family Gelechiidae. It is found in China (Shaanxi) and Russia, where it is known only from the southern part of Primorsky Krai.

The wingspan is about 14 mm. Adults are similar to Acanthophila beljaevi, but the forewings have a yellowish-brown ground colour and are dilated distally.

References

qinlingensis
Moths described in 1996
Moths of Asia